Hugo Núñez (born 14 April 1961) is an Ecuadorian former professional tennis player.

Biography
Núñez grew up in both Ecuador and the United States. He was born in Guayaquil and went to high school in New Jersey, then attended Southern Illinois University Edwardsville (SIUE). In 1980, he teamed up with Juan Farrow to win the NCAA Men's Division II doubles championship, having lost to Farrow in the singles championship final.

A right-handed player, Núñez reached a best singles ranking on the professional tour of 222 in the world. His best performance on the Grand Prix circuit was a second round appearance at the 1988 Livingston Open. He won three ATP Challenger doubles titles during his career.

Between 1987 and 1992 he featured in a total of seven Davis Cup ties for Ecuador.

Challenger titles

Doubles: (3)

See also
List of Ecuador Davis Cup team representatives

References

External links
 
 
 

1961 births
Living people
Ecuadorian male tennis players
SIU Edwardsville Cougars men's tennis players
Sportspeople from Guayaquil